The University Alliance in Talent Education Development, abbreviated as UAiTED, is the organizational body that includes 16 universities from Singapore, Hong Kong, Taiwan & Malaysia. It is a strategic network of academic, profit and nonprofit professional associations and organizations who are committed to assist in the preparation, promotion, and professional development of future talents. 

UAiTED focuses on four main areas:
Industry internships
Education
Innovation
Industry-academia collaboration

List of member institutions

References

Professional associations based in Taiwan
Educational institutions established in 2019
2019 establishments in Taiwan
College and university associations and consortia in Asia